M.F.A. is a 2017 American thriller film directed by Natalia Leite and written by Leah McKendrick. The film stars Francesca Eastwood, Clifton Collins Jr., Leah McKendrick, Peter Vack, David Huynh, Marlon Young, David Sullivan, Michael Welch and Mike Manning. The film was released on October 13, 2017, by Dark Sky Films.

Plot   
Noelle, an introvert California fine arts graduate student, accepts an invitation to a party by a handsome classmate she has a crush on, only to be lured into his room where he rapes her. The following night Noelle confronts her rapist and in a moment of rage, accidentally kills him. But, much to her surprise, an unexpected surge of inspiration will gradually fuel both her stagnant artistic expression and her thirst for revenge on those who assaulted the lives of innocent women. Now, Noelle becomes a pitiless vigilante who uses her newly-found sex-appeal to serve her cause. When she attacks the man who many years before assaulted her friend Skye, she is found out by Skye and later the police. At the end, after the ceremony in which she receives her Master of Fine Arts degree and speaks as valedictorian, she is arrested.

Cast   
 Francesca Eastwood as Noelle
 Clifton Collins Jr. as Kennedy
 Leah McKendrick as Skye
 Peter Vack as Luke
 David Huynh as Shane
 Marlon Young as Professor Rudd
 David Sullivan as Cavanaugh
 Michael Welch as Mason
 Mike Manning as Jeremiah
 Andrew Caldwell as Ryder
 Kyler Pettis as Conor

Release 
The film premiered at South by Southwest on March 13, 2017. On June 8, 2017, Dark Sky Films acquired distribution rights to the film. The film was released on October 13, 2017, by Dark Sky Films.

Critical reception 
Rotten Tomatoes reported an 80% approval rating, based on 25 reviews, with an average score of 6.8/10.

The Hollywood Reporter staff said the film was "less a pulse-pounding thriller than a conversation starter about injustice and vigilantism." Leah Pickett of the Chicago Reader praised Francesca Eastwood's performance, calling it "magnetic and convincing", but criticizing the character's "implausibly quick switch from wallflower to assassin."

References

External links 
 
 

2017 films
2017 thriller films
American thriller films
American vigilante films
Films set in California
Films set in universities and colleges
Films shot in California
American rape and revenge films
2010s English-language films
2010s American films